Happy Days (Italian: Giorni felici) is a 1942 Italian "white-telephones" comedy film directed by Gianni Franciolini and starring Lilia Silvi, Amedeo Nazzari and Leonardo Cortese. It was based on a play by Claude-André Puget, which had been made into a French film Les jours heureux the previous year.

It was shot at the Palatino Studios in Rome. The film's sets were designed by the art directors Piero Filippone and Mario Rappini.

Synopsis
Due to engine trouble, an aviator is forced to land and spend the day at a villa while his plane is repaired by mechanics. His arrival provokes both love and jealousy amongst the villa's inhabitants.

Cast
 Lilia Silvi as Franca 
 Amedeo Nazzari as Michele 
 Leonardo Cortese as Oliviero 
 Valentina Cortese as Marianna 
 Vera Carmi as Nietta 
 Paolo Stoppa as Bernardo 
 Silvio Bagolini as Il motorista 
 Alfredo Salvatori as Il meccanico

References

Bibliography 
 Ruth Ben-Ghiat. Italian Fascism's Empire Cinema. Indiana University Press, 2015.

External links 
 

1942 films
Italian comedy films
Italian black-and-white films
1942 comedy films
1940s Italian-language films
Films directed by Gianni Franciolini
Italian films based on plays
Minerva Film films
Films shot at Palatino Studios
1940s Italian films